Loyd B. "Rob" Roberson II (born August 4, 1968) is an American politician. He is a member of the Mississippi House of Representatives from the 43rd district, having been elected in 2015. He was previously a member of the House from the 37th district and ran unsuccessfully for the 15th state senate district in 2003.

References

1968 births
Living people
Republican Party members of the Mississippi House of Representatives
21st-century American politicians